Alekos Livaditis (1914 – March 23, 1980) was a Greek actor in theatre and cinema.  He was the son of Lissandros.

Biography
He was a graduate of the Central Trade School.  His first appearance was in the movie To tragoudi tou horismou (The Divorce Song).  He also played in Voice of the Heart (1942), I vila me ta noufara (1944), Gambros me dossis (1947), O emiris ke o kakomiris (1963), etc.  He took part in the empty hermitage as he disappeared from prose theater with Christoforos Nezer and Anna Lori in 1948 at the Akropol.  From then he participated in great acts including Kalouta-Krevata-Rena Dor in 1949, Kalouta only in 1950 and later with Orestis Makris, Vassilis Avlonitis, Nikos Stavridis, Rena Vlachopoulou, K. Hadjihristou, Kaiti Diridaua and Sofia Vebo in many musical presentations and comedies.

He began writing articles in 1949 elsewhere in Egypt, Cyprus, Istanbul in which he done in 1951 until 1951.  From 1968 until 1971, he done many articles in all of the cities in Greece.

Livaditis was also a director in the movie 100,000 Pounds, he was a member of the Greek Actors Guild (SEI), and president of the SEI Revenue Countil.  He was awarded by George II of Greece with a metal during the Albanian War along with King Paul for his presentation in Greece and around the world.  He was also awarded by the Patriarchate of Alexandria.  He lived alone in the Votanikos neighbourhood in Athens and died there in 1980, aged 66.

Selected filmography

References
"Who's Who 1979" pg 360.

External links

Greek screenwriters
Greek film directors
Greek male actors
1914 births
1980 deaths
20th-century Greek male actors
20th-century screenwriters
Male actors from Athens